"I Wanna Do It With You" is a pop song written by George Young and Harry Vanda and recorded by Australian pop singer John Paul Young. The song was released in February 1977 as the lead single from Young's third studio album, Green (1977). The song peaked at number 7 on the Kent Music Report, becoming Young's 4th Australian top ten single.

Track listing 
7" (AP 11372) 
Side A "I Wanna Do It With You" - 3:00
Side B "The Painting" (John Paul Young, Warren Morgan) - 4:30

Charts

Weekly charts

Year-end charts

References 

1977 songs
1977 singles
John Paul Young songs
Songs written by Harry Vanda
Songs written by George Young (rock musician)
Song recordings produced by Harry Vanda
Song recordings produced by George Young (rock musician)
Albert Productions singles